James Hebblethwaite (22 September 1857 – 13 September 1921) was an English-born Australian poet, teacher and clergyman.

Life 
Hebblethwaite was born in Preston, Lancashire, England, the son of William Hebblethwaite, a corn miller, and his wife Margaret, née Cundall. His family was originally prosperous but later suffered heavy financial losses, and Hebblethwaite practically educated himself by gaining scholarships. Hebblethwaite was at St John's College, Battersea, London in 1877-8, and entering on a teaching life became headmaster of a board school, and lecturer in English at the Harris Institute, Preston.

In 1892 Hebblethwaite emigrated to Tasmania for health reasons, and obtained a position on the staff of the Friends' School, Hobart. In 1896 a little volume, Verses, was published at Hobart. About this time he entered the Congregational ministry, and in 1899 was principal of Queen's College, Latrobe, Tasmania. In 1900 A Rose of Regret was published. He was ordained as a deacon in the Church of England in 1903 and in 1904 became a priest. He was vicar of George Town, Tasmania, from 1905 to 1908, Swansea, Tasmania,  from 1908 to 1909, and D'Entrecasteaux Channel from 1909 to 1916, when he retired. Another volume, Meadow and Bush, had appeared in 1911, and a collected edition of his poems in 1920. New Poems was published in 1921 and he died in that year. In addition to his poetry he wrote a novel, Castle Hill, published in England in 1895. He was twice married and left a widow and one son.

Hebblethwaite was a man of charming personality. Apparently immersed in a world of dreams, he never allowed himself to neglect his work as a parish clergyman. He was interested in his young men and their sports, and his own simple and sincere piety earned him much respect and affection. As a writer of lyrical poems he has a secure place among the Australian poets of his time.

Bibliography

Novel 
 Castlehill: Or, a Tale of Two Hemispheres (1895)

Poetry collections 
 Verse (1896)
 A Rose of Regret (1900)
 Meadow and Bush: A Book of Verses (1911)
 The Poems of James Hebblethwaite (1920)
 New Poems of James Hebblethwaite (1921)

References

External Links
 

1857 births
1921 deaths
Australian poets
Australian people of English descent
Schoolteachers from Preston, Lancashire